Dušan Janićijević (27 April 1932 – 5 July 2011) was a Serbian actor. He appeared in more than one hundred films from 1954 to 2011.

Filmography

References

External links 

1932 births
2011 deaths
Serbian male film actors